Quién is a Spanish pronoun meaning "who" or "whom" and may refer to:

"Quién" (Ricardo Arjona song), 2007
"Quién" (Pablo Alborán song), 2012
¿Quién? (TV series), 1973 Televisa telenovela
¿Quién? (album), 1974 album by Mari Trini